A celestial body, as the sun or moon or an object that gives light; or, a person of eminence or brilliant achievement. From Old French luminarie or late Latin luminarium, from Latin lumen, lumin- "light".

Luminary may also refer to:
Luminary (astrology), in traditional astrology, one of the two brightest and most astrological planets: the Sun and the Moon
Luminary (Gnosticism), of which four are typically given

Media
The Luminary, Atlanta, Georgia's first newspaper (1846–1849)
Luminary (Laramore), a public artwork created in 2008 on the campus of Indiana University-Purdue University Indianapolis

Fiction
"Luminary" (Millennium), the 12th episode of season 2 (and 34th overall) of Millennium, which aired in 1998
Global Luminary or Luminary – Rise of the Goonzu, a game on game portal NDOORS
The Luminaries, 2013 novel by Eleanor Catton
The Luminary, the player character of Dragon Quest XI

Other uses
 Luminary Group, a licensing and intellectual property management company
 Luminary (podcast network), a subscription podcast network

See also
Festival of Lights (disambiguation)
Kobe Luminarie, a Japanese light festival
Luminaire, a light fixture
Luminaria, a type of Mexican lantern
Luminárias, a Brazilian municipality located in the state of Minas Gerais
My Luminaries, a British alternative rock band, active 2004–2010